This is a list of companies based or having major operations in the Phoenix metropolitan area.

Fortune 100
2020 listings:

Fortune 500
Avnet (169)
Freeport-McMoRan (221)
Republic Services (305)
PetSmart (386)
Insight Enterprises (409)
Magellan Health (432)

Fortune 1000
Sprouts Farmers Market (502)
ON Semiconductor (512)
Microchip Technology (522)
Carlisle Companies (563)
Taylor Morrison (567)
NortonLifeLock (573)
Carvana (651)
Amkor Technology (639)
Knight-Swift Transportation (679)
Pinnacle West Capital Corporation (701)
First Solar (770)
GoDaddy (787)
Benchmark Electronics (930)

NLJ 250 law firms
 Ballard Spahr (76)
 Snell & Wilmer (104)
 Lewis and Roca (213)
 Fennemore Craig (220)

Other significant corporate headquarters and franchisors

Amkor Technology (Tempe)
Apollo Education Group (Phoenix)
Arizona Federal Credit Union (Phoenix)
Arizona Public Service (Phoenix)
Arizona Republic (Phoenix)
Axon (Scottsdale)
Banner Health (Phoenix)
Bashas' Supermarkets (Chandler)
Best Western (Phoenix)
Cable One (Phoenix)
Casino Arizona (Scottsdale)
Choice Hotels (Scottsdale)
Circle K (Tempe)
DDC-I (Phoenix)
Desert Schools Federal Credit Union (Phoenix)
Dillon Aero (Scottsdale)
Discount Tire (Scottsdale)
DriveTime (Phoenix)
Fender Musical Instruments Corporation (Scottsdale)
Forever Living Products (Scottsdale)
FreeLife (Phoenix)
Four Peaks Brewery (Tempe)
Fry's Food and Drug (Tolleson)
Fulton Homes (Tempe)
Grand Canyon University (Phoenix)
Harkins Theatres (Scottsdale)
Hensley & Co. (Phoenix)
JDA Software Group (Scottsdale)
Kahala Brands (Scottsdale)
Keap (Chandler)
Kona Grill (Scottsdale)
Leslie's Swimming Pool Supplies (Phoenix)
Limelight Networks (Tempe)
Massage Envy (Scottsdale)
Meritage Homes Corporation (Scottsdale)
Mesa Air Group (Phoenix)
Microchip Technology (Chandler)
Mobile Mini (Tempe)
ON Semiconductor (Phoenix)
OnTrac (Chandler)
P.F. Chang's China Bistro (Scottsdale)
Peter Piper Pizza (Phoenix)
Ping Golf (Phoenix)
Pure Flix Entertainment (Scottsdale)
Rural Metro (Scottsdale)
Salt River Project (Phoenix)
Shamrock Farms (Phoenix)
Tilted Kilt (Tempe)
U-Haul (Phoenix)
Universal Technical Institute (Phoenix)
Versum Materials (Tempe)
Viad (Phoenix)

Other corporations with significant operations

Alaska Airlines - commercial airline
Albertsons - retail
Amazon.com - online retailing
American Airlines - commercial airline
Applied Materials - semiconductors
Alliant Techsystems Inc. - aerospace
Boeing - aerospace and defense
Centurylink - telecommunications
Charles Schwab - financial services
Cox Communications - telecommunications
Dignity Health - healthcare
Discover Card - financial services
Edward Jones Investments - financial services
Freescale Semiconductor - semiconductors
General Dynamics C4 Systems - aerospace and defense
GE Finance Franchise Corporation
Home Depot - retail
Honeywell International - conglomerate
Humana - health care
Hyundai Engineering (HEC) - engineering & construction services
IBM - computer hardware
Infusionsoft - software
Intel - semiconductors
Local Motors - automotive manufacturing
Kroger - retail
Marriott International - hospitality
Mayo Clinic - health care
Medtronic - medical equipment
Motorola - telecommunications
Northern Trust - financial services
Opendoor - real estate
PTI Securities & Futures
PulteGroup - home construction
Raytheon - aerospace and defense
Safeway - retail
Southwest Airlines - commercial airline
State Farm - insurance
Target Corporation - retail
U.S. Foodservice - food industry
USAA - financial services
Vanguard Group - financial services
Wal-Mart - retail
Walgreens - retail
Yelp, Inc. - sales
ZipRecruiter - recruiting services

See also
 List of Arizona companies

References

Phoenix